Someshwara Temple can refer to:

 Someshwara Temple, near Mangalore
 Someshwara Temple, Kolar
 Someshwara Temple, Marathahalli
 Someshvara Temple, Haranhalli
 Halasuru Someshwara Temple, Bangalore
 Somesvara Siva Temple